Union Neuchâtel Basket, commonly known as Union Neuchâtel, is a Swiss basketball club based in Neuchâtel. It plays in the Swiss Basketball League (SBL), the top tier basketball division in Switzerland. The club has won one trophy, the Swiss Cup in 2013.

Honours
Swiss Basketball Cup
Champions (1): 2013
 Swiss Basketball League Cup
Winners (1): 2014

Current roster

Notable players 

  Noe Anabir
  Evrard Atcho
  Frederic Barman
  Bryan Conlon
  Selim Fofana
  Yoan Granvorka
  Brian Savoy
  Florian Steinmann
  Jules Aw
  Pape Badji
  Babacar Toure
  Ivica Radosavljević
  Mohamed Ben Hassen
  David Bell
  
  Antonio Ballard
  Quinton Day
  Marquis Jackson
  Dom Morris
  James Padgett
  Chad Timberlake

References

External links
Official website

Basketball teams established in 1999
Basketball teams in Switzerland
Sport in Neuchâtel
1999 establishments in Switzerland